The Puster Valley is one of the largest longitudinal valleys in the Alps that runs in an east-west direction between Lienz in East Tyrol, Austria, and Mühlbach near Brixen in South Tyrol, Italy. The South Tyrolean municipalities of the Puster Valley constitute the Puster Valley district.

Puster Valley

The Puster Valley is located in the western part of the Periadriatic Seam, which separates the Southern Limestone Alps from the Central Eastern Alps, as well as most of the limestone Alps from the central gneiss and slate peaks of the range's central section. East of Sillian, the Puster Valley leaves the Peradriatic Line (which moves into the Gail valley) and turns to the northeast towards Lienz.

Half of the valley drains to the west to the Adriatic via the Adige river; the other half drains to the east to the Black Sea via the Danube. The watershed lies in the shallow valley floor called Toblacher Feld. The Rienz river flows westwards through the Puster Valley and the Drau river flows eastwards into East Tyrol. The eastern part of the valley on the upper Drava is called Upper Puster Valley.

The most important of these towns in the western valley are Toblach, Welsberg-Taisten, Olang, and Bruneck; the most important in the eastern valley are Innichen, Sexten, and Sillian.

The largest tributaries of the Rienz river form the Antholzer Bach, the Ahr, the Pragser Bach, the Gsieser Bach, the Gran Ega, the Pfunderer Bach, and the Lüsenbach. The Puster Valley's largest side valley is the Tauferer Ahrntal. The Drau's largest eastern tributaries are the Sextner Bach and the Villgraten-Bach.

History 
The Puster Valley was inhabited since prehistoric times as finds belonging to the Iron Age have been found in that area. In more recent times this zone was inhabited by people belonging to the Illyrian stock: they were called  "Saevates" by the Romans (hence the name "Sebatum" of the Roman station of today's Saint Lawrence.) In the 6th century, the Celtic invaders merged with the Illyrian population.  Around the end of the I century B.C, the Rienz valley was mainly used by the Romans as an arterial road to connect the north-eastern regions of the Empire. The Puster Valley belonged to the imperial province of Noricum, and the local populations,  during the four centuries of the domination of Rome, began to assimilate the customs, the language and finally the Christian religion. In the 5th century the Goths, the Baiuvarii and the Slavs decided to descend in this area, with consequent conflicts between Baiuvarii and Slavs, which ended with the Baiuvarii victory. In the 10th century the Puster Valley started to belong to the Pustrissa countship; in 1091 the countship was ceded by the Emperor Henry IV to the  Bishop of Brixen and in the 16th century the Hapsburg took possession of it. During the Napoleonic era, following the Austrian defeat at Austerlitz and the treaty of Pressburg in 1805,  the entire region passed to the Bavaria: the Tyroleans, led by Andreas Hofer, repeatedly fought against the Bavarian domination. After Napoleon's fall, the Puster valley was reunited with Austria and, following the World War I, it was assigned to Italy.

Opening in 1871 the Puster Valley Railway uses the relative simple landscape to avoid climbing steep slopes.

Puster Valley District

The Puster Valley District was founded in 1969 with the merger of 26 municipalities. Its combined area is 2,071 km² and its population is over 73,000. Its main town is Bruneck. According to the 2001 census, 80.96% of the population of the valley speak German, 13.40% Ladin, and 5.64% Italian as their native language.

The following municipalities are part of the Puster Valley District:

Gallery

References

External links

Puster Valley District 

Valleys of South Tyrol
Districts of South Tyrol